Rajiv Gumber is an Indian politician and a member of the Eighteenth Legislative Assembly of Uttar Pradesh. He was also member of Sixteenth Legislative Assembly of Uttar Pradesh. Gumber represented the Saharanpur Nagar constituency of Uttar Pradesh and is a member of the Bharatiya Janata Party political party.

Early life and education
Rajiv Gumber was born in Saharanpur district, Uttar Pradesh, India in 1970. Gumber's highest attained education is intermediate. Before entering politics, he was a businessperson.

Political career
Gumber won the Saharanpur Nagar (Assembly constituency) election in 2022. He was an MLA for one term from 2014 to 2017. He represents  the Bharatiya Janata Party. He was elected during the by-election held on 13 September 2014 after the sitting MLA Raghav Lakhanpal resigned in May 2014 after getting elected to 16th Lok Sabha.

Posts held

See also
 Uttar Pradesh Legislative Assembly

References
 

Bharatiya Janata Party politicians from Uttar Pradesh
People from Saharanpur district
1970 births
Living people
Uttar Pradesh MLAs 2012–2017
Uttar Pradesh politicians
Uttar Pradesh MLAs 2022–2027